Major General Silver Kayemba is a senior military officer in the Uganda People's Defense Force (UPDF). He currently serves as the Military Attaché at Uganda's Permanent Mission to the United Nations in New York City.

Background and education
He was born in the Central Region of Uganda.

Career
In 2010, at the rank of Brigadier, he served as the chief of training and operations for the UPDF. From May 2011, until August 2012, at the rank of Brigadier, he served as the Chief of Staff of the UPDF Land Forces. In September 2012, he was promoted to Major General and was posted to the United Nations headquarters in New York City.

See also
 Henry Tumukunde
 Salim Saleh
 Elly Tumwine
 Katumba Wamala
 List of military schools in Uganda

References

External links
 Ugandan Brigadier General Silver Kayemba Welcomes Colonel (Dr.) William Walters to Soroti, Uganda, for the training exercise Natural Fire 2006 on 9 August 2006

Living people
Ganda people
Ugandan military personnel
Ugandan generals
People from Central Region, Uganda
Year of birth missing (living people)